Albert Salvadó i Miras (1 February 1951 – 3 December 2020) was an Andorran writer and industrial engineer. He wrote in both Catalan and Spanish.

Salvadó wrote children's stories, essays and novels, often focusing on historical fiction. He has been described as breathing new life into the historical novel in the Catalan language.

In the crime fiction genre, he has written El rapte, el mort i el Marsellès (Serie Negra Prize 2000), and Una vida en joc, dedicated to the former Casino de la Rabassada (1910).
In the suspense novel genre, he has written Un vot per l'esperança, a novel that won the title of "Selected Work" in the Plaza & Janés International Novel Prize in 1985 and L'informe Phaeton, which has received unanimous acclaim  from the public, who say this is his most impressive novel.
In historical fiction he has written books set in different eras: The Teacher of Cheops (Néstor Luján Prize Historical Novel 1998); L'anell d'Àtila (Fiter i Rossell Prize 1999); Els ulls d'Anníbal (Charlemagne Prize 2002); La Gran Concubina d'Egipte (Nestor Lujan Prize 2005); the trilogy dedicated to James I the Conqueror (2000s) comprising: El punyal del sarraí, La reina hongaresa and Parleu o mateu-me; the trilogy dedicated to Ali Bey comprising: Maleït català, Maleït musulmà and Maleït cristià; and  Obre els ulls i desperta, set in 17th-century Prague.

Selected works
L'enigma de Constantí el Gran
El mestre de Kheops
L'anell d'Àtila
El rapte, el mort i el Marsellès
Jaume I el Conqueridor (El punyal del sarraí, La reina hongaresa, Parleu o mateu-me)
L'ull del diable
El relat de Gunter Psarris
Un vot per l'esperança
Els ulls d'Anníbal
L’ombra d’Ali Bei (Maleït català!, Maleït musulmà!, Maleït cristià!)
La gran concubina d'Amon
L'informe Phaeton
Una vida en joc
 Obre els ulls i desperta (Meteora)
El ball de la vida co-author Anna Tohà
Vols viure?

Awards
1982 - Premi Xerric-Xerrac de contes infantils for La imaginació del nen
1985 - Obra seleccionada per al premi Plaza & Janés for Libertad para Satanás
1997 - Finalista del Premi Nèstor Luján de novel·la històrica for L'Enigma de Constantí el Gran
1998 - Premi Nèstor Luján de novel·la històrica for The teacher of Cheops
1999 - Premi Fiter i Rossell for L'anell d'Àtila
2000 - Premi Sèrie Negra de Planeta for El rapte, el mort i el marsellès
2002 - Premi Carlemany for Els Ulls d'Anníbal
2005 - Premi Nèstor Luján de novel·la històrica for La Gran concubina de Amon
2016 - Premi Internacional El Vi Fa Sang to their literary trajectory
2018 - Premi Àgora Cultural del Principat d'Andorra 2017 for his contribution to the enrichment of the literature from Andorra, particularly in the domain of the Historical Novel

References

External links
 Personal webpage of Albert Salvadó

Andorran writers
People from Andorra la Vella
Catalan-language writers
1951 births
2020 deaths
Deaths in Andorra